Epiperipatus biolleyi is a species of velvet worm in the Peripatidae family. This species is red, without any pattern, on its dorsal surface. Females of this species have 28 to 32 pairs of legs; males have 25 to 30. Females range from 18 mm to 75 mm in length, with a mean length of 52 mm, whereas males range from 18 mm to 55 mm, with a mean length of 38 mm. The type locality is in Costa Rica.

References

Further reading

Onychophorans of tropical America
Onychophoran species
Fauna of Costa Rica
Animals described in 1902
Taxa named by Eugène Louis Bouvier